"You Can't Stop the Girl" is a song by American singer Bebe Rexha for the soundtrack of the 2019 Disney film Maleficent: Mistress of Evil. It was released as a single on September 20, 2019. It was included on the soundtrack of the film, which was released on October 18, 2019.

Background and promotion
Rexha announced the single on September 17, 2019, following a snippet released the day before. The writers of "Flagpole Sita" by Harvey Danger are credited as songwriters due to melodic similarity.

Critical reception
Claire Shaffer of Rolling Stone wrote that the song "spins the story of Maleficent into a classic girl empowerment anthem [...] and lets Rexha show off her impressive vocal belt." Writing for MTV, Trey Alston stated that "Bebe Rexha has just provided the anthem for power and resilience this winter [...] Being that it's attached to something so massive, it makes sense that it is so wide-eyed and vivid, ready to rear into roaring view. Inevitability has never sounded so strong."

Music video
The inspirational music video was directed by Sophie Muller. It features Rexha leading fellow female runners through a city. The video also shows Rexha wandering through a "magical" and "butterfly-filled" forest while sporting a glittering black gown and headpiece. The video was released on October 15, 2019.

Credits and personnel
Credits adapted from Tidal.
Bebe Rexha – vocals, songwriter
The Futuristics – songwriter, producer
Aaron Huffman – songwriter
Evan Sult – songwriter
Jeff Lin – songwriter
Micheal Pollack – songwriter
Nate Cyphert – songwriter
Sean Nelson – songwriter
Geoff Zanelli – orchestra and choir arranger
Randy Merrill – masterer
Manny Marroquin – mixer

Charts

Release history

References

External links
 
 
 

2019 singles
2019 songs
Bebe Rexha songs
Songs written by Bebe Rexha
Songs written by Michael Pollack (musician)
Songs written by Alex Schwartz
Songs written by Joe Khajadourian
Song recordings produced by the Futuristics
Maleficent (franchise)
Music videos directed by Sophie Muller
Disney songs
Songs about fictional female characters